Moonflowers is the eighth studio album by Finnish melodic doom metal band Swallow the Sun. It was released on 19 November 2021 through Century Media Records.

Track listing

Personnel 
Swallow the Sun
 Mikko Kotamäki – lead vocals
 Juho Räihä – rhythm guitar
 Juha Raivio – lead guitar, backing vocals, keyboards
 Matti Honkonen – bass guitar
 Juuso Raatikainen – drums

Guest musicians
 Jaani Peuhu – backing vocals
 Antti Hyyrynen – backing vocals (tracks 3, 7)
 Cammie Gilbert – vocals (track 5)
 Aino Rautakorpi – violin
 Helena Dumell – viola
 Annika Furstenborg – cello

Production and art
 Hannu Honkonen – post-production (midi strings)
 Doppelganger-Art – artwork (band members painting)
 Rami Mursula – layout
 Tony Lindgren – mastering
 David Castillo – recording (drums, clean vocals)
 Juha Raivio – cover art, producer
 Juho Räihä – mixing, recording (growl vocals, guitars, bass, strings)

Charts

References 

2021 albums
Swallow the Sun albums
Century Media Records albums